Ishq Zaat is a Pakistani drama television series aired on LTN Family in 2019. It features Inayat Khan, Sarah Aijaz Khan and Sameer Khan in leading roles.

Cast
Inayat Khan as Amar Singh
Sarah Aijaz Khan as Noor
Sameer Khan as Ahmad Chaudhry
Khalid Butt as Haji Aslam
Saba Faisal as Aalia
Zia Khan as Sarwar Chaudhry
Ayesha Khan as Roopa
Anjum Malik as Taran Jeet Singh
Tanveer Malik as Anoop
Abdul Wahab Malik as Ramesh
Shaista Sanam as Balwanti
Shizza Khan as Sohni
Shehla Khan as Rukhsana
Masood Akhtar as Allama
Zaria Khan as Bani
Samar Hamdani as Gurmeet
Iqra Qaiser as Jassie
Jameel Bhutta as Roshu
Beenish Arooj as Tara Singh
Neha Malik as Aliya (young)
Hira Faisal as Rukhsana (young)
Kashan Mir as Akbar
Isma Aslam as Bunty
Shuja Ansari
Majeed Arain
Hira Shehla
Sobia Shehbaz

Production

Location
The shooting of the serial took place at the Eminabad, Aastana Alia Chura Sharif and Gurdwara Rori Sahib.

References

External links 
 

Pakistani drama television series
2019 Pakistani television series debuts